Young-Hae Chang Heavy Industries (장영혜중공업) is a Seoul-based Web art group consisting of Young-hae Chang and Marc Voge. The group formed in 1999. Young-Hae Chang, is a Korean artist and translator with a Ph.D in aesthetics from Universite de Paris I. Marc Voge is an American poet who lives in Seoul.

Their work, presented in 20 languages, is characterized by text-based animation composed in Adobe Flash that is highly synchronized to a musical score that is often original and typically jazz. In 2000, YHCHI's work was recognized by the San Francisco Museum of Modern Art for its contribution to online art. The group uses "Monaco" as the font for all their work, because they liked the way the name sounded. In 2001 the group was awarded a grant from the Foundation for Contemporary Arts Grants to Artists. Their solo show, "Black On White, Gray Ascending", a seven-channel installation, was part of the inaugural opening of the New Museum of Contemporary Art, New York, in 2007. They are 2012 Rockefeller Foundation Bellagio Creative Arts Fellows. In 2018-19 their work was part of the 9th Asia Pacific Triennial of Contemporary Art (APT9), at the Queensland Art Gallery / Gallery of Modern Art, Brisbane, Australia.

According to the artists, their piece Dakota "is based on a close reading of Ezra Pound's Cantos I and first part of II." Their pieces are characterized by speed, references to film, concrete poetry, etc. Their work is sometimes called digital literature or net art, but there is no consensus.

Their work is held in the collections of the Tate Museum, the Centre Pompidou, Paris, Queensland Art Gallery | Gallery of Modern Art, Brisbane, Australia  and M+ Hong Kong.

References

External links
Young-Hae Chang Heavy Industries Presents, (Official Site)
"The Art of Sleep" and "The Art of Silence" - a piece commissioned by the Tate Gallery, including an interview with Young-Hae Chang Heavy Industries.
"Les Amants De Beaubourg / The Lovers of Beaubourg," a specially commissioned work for the 30th anniversary of the Centre Pompidou.
Intercultural medium literature digital: Interview with Young-Hae Chang Heavy Industries
Pressman, Jessica. "The Strategy of Digital Modernism: Young-hae Chang Heavy Industries' Dakota," Modern Fiction Studies 54(2); 302-26.
Pressman, Jessica. "Pacific Rim Digital Modernism: The Electronic Literature of Young-hae Chang Heavy Industries", in Mary Ann Gillies, Helen Sword, Steven Yao, "Pacific Rim Modernisms", University of Toronto Press, December 2009, 316-332.
N. Katherine Hayles, Electronic Literature: New Horizons for the Literary, Notre Dame: University of Notre Dame Press, 2008. 19-30, 124-29
Young-Hae Chang Heavy Industries profile at Kadist Art Foundation

South Korean artists
American contemporary artists
Webby Award winners
Electronic literature writers